The Croix de Culet is a mountain of the Chablais Alps, overlooking Champéry in the canton of Valais. It lies between the valleys of Les Crosets and Planachaux.

The summit can by reached by cable car from Champéry. In winter the mountain is part of the ski area Portes du Soleil.

See also
List of mountains of Switzerland accessible by public transport

References

External links
 Pointe de l'Au on Hikr

Mountains of the Alps
Mountains of Valais
Mountains of Switzerland
One-thousanders of Switzerland